Cristian Miguel Riveros Núñez (born 16 October 1982) is a Paraguayan professional footballer who plays for Libertad as a defensive midfielder.

A full international for Paraguay since 2005, he has earned 99 caps for his country, playing at two FIFA World Cup competitions (2006 and 2010) and three Copa América tournaments (2007, 2011 and 2015).

On 19 July 2015, Paraguayan newspaper ExtraPRESS named Riveros the most expensive player in Paraguay.

Club career

Early career
Riveros started his career with local side Cristobal Colón in his hometown of Juan Augusto Saldivar  and then moved to other Paraguayan teams such as San Lorenzo and Tacuary before playing for Libertad.

Cruz Azul
On 12 July 2007 he signed for the Mexican club Cruz Azul.

Sunderland
On 11 May 2010, Riveros signed for Sunderland of the English Premier League on a three-year-deal, saying  "The league is very competitive and I look forward to being very successful with Sunderland. The Premier League is the best league in the world and Sunderland are a very big club with many passionate supporters. I look forward to meeting them."

He made his Premier League debut on 14 August 2010 as a 63rd-minute substitute for Steed Malbranque in a 2–2 draw against Birmingham City in the opening game of the season. However, Riveros quickly fell out of favour and played just 14 league games for, the club, scoring his only goal on the final day of the season in a 3–0 win over West Ham United.

Kayserispor
Riveros joined Turkish Süper Lig side Kayserispor on 6 July 2011 on a season-long loan from Sunderland, and signed a permanent contract on 1 May 2012.

Grêmio
On 7 June 2013, Riveros joined Grêmio, signing a two-year contract.

Olimpia Asunción
In January 2015 after long and exhausting negotiations, it was announced that Grêmio and Club Olimpia Asunción had reached an agreement to sign Riveros for the 2015 Paraguayan Primera División season. Riveros was Instrumental for Olimpia to win their 40th Local Championship, for his experience and skills and also for his leadership on and off the pitch.

Libertad
On 7 December 2017, sports news outlet D10 Paraguay announced that Riveros would sign a two-year contract with Libertad, returning to the club after 11 years.

Nacional Asunción
He joined Nacional Asunción for the 2020 season.

Libertad
On 18 January 2022 of Paraguay's summer transfer window, Riveros officially completed a transfer to Libertad. Anterior to this, Riveros already performed the 2022 pre-season training with Nacional Asunción, however, he joined Libertad for the third time in his career, being at the request of Argentine coach Daniel Garnero. By this way, he was one of three FIFA World Cup players in Libertad's team, being with Oscar Cardozo and Roque Santa Cruz.

International career
Riveros played in Paraguay's first two matches at the 2006 World Cup and played efficiently on the left wing. He picked up his first international goal for Paraguay in a 3–2 defeat to Chile. He also played for Paraguay in the Copa América 2007.

2010 FIFA World Cup
On 4 May 2010, he was named in Paraguay's preliminary 30-man squad for the 2010 FIFA World Cup, and also made the 23-man penultimate selection alongside club team-mate da Silva.

On 20 June 2010 at the World Cup, Riveros scored a second goal in a 2–0 win over Slovakia, which was set up by former Sunderland defender Paulo Da Silva.
Riveros scored a penalty in Paraguay's shoot-out win against Japan in the Round of 16 stage, after the match finished goalless after extra time.

Career statistics

Club

International

International goals
Scores and results list Paraguay's goal tally first.

Honours

Club
Libertad
 Paraguayan Primera División: 2006, 2007

See also
List of men's footballers with 100 or more international caps

References

External links

 
 

1982 births
Living people
People from Central Department
Association football midfielders
Paraguayan footballers
Paraguayan expatriate footballers
Paraguay international footballers
Club Tacuary footballers
Club Sportivo San Lorenzo footballers
Club Libertad footballers
Cruz Azul footballers
Sunderland A.F.C. players
Kayserispor footballers
Grêmio Foot-Ball Porto Alegrense players
Club Olimpia footballers
Club Nacional footballers
Paraguayan Primera División players
Premier League players
Süper Lig players
Liga MX players
Campeonato Brasileiro Série A players
Expatriate footballers in Mexico
Expatriate footballers in England
Expatriate footballers in Turkey
Expatriate footballers in Brazil
Paraguayan expatriate sportspeople in Mexico
Paraguayan expatriate sportspeople in England
Paraguayan expatriate sportspeople in Turkey
Paraguayan expatriate sportspeople in Brazil
2006 FIFA World Cup players
2010 FIFA World Cup players
2007 Copa América players
2011 Copa América players
FIFA Century Club